James Dixon "Jimmy" Barnes  (née Swan; born 28 April 1956) is a Scottish-born Australian rock singer. His career, both as a solo performer and as the lead vocalist with the rock band Cold Chisel, has made him one of the most popular and best-selling Australian music artists of all time. He is well known for his powerful style of vocals.

Barnes has achieved 15 solo number one albums in Australia, more than any other artist. Additionally Barnes achieved 5 more as lead singer of Cold Chisel, bringing his combined sum to 20 number one albums in Australia, comfortably eclipsing the Beatles (with 14), Madonna (12), Eminem and U2 (11).

Early life
Barnes was born James Dixon Swan in the Cowcaddens area of Glasgow, the son of Dorothy and Jim Swan. His father was a prizefighter. His maternal grandmother was Jewish, but he was raised Protestant. He called his childhood environment a "slum" of alcohol and violence, saying that his mother had him and his four siblings (John, Dorothy, Linda, and Alan) before she was 21. His older brother, John, also later became known as a singer under the name Swanee. John encouraged and taught Barnes how to sing, as he was not initially interested. He and his family arrived in Australia when he was five years old on 21 January 1962, originally in Adelaide, though they eventually settled in nearby Elizabeth. Another sister, Lisa, was born later that year. Shortly afterwards, their parents divorced. Dorothy remarried, to a clerk named Reg Barnes, who died on 3 September 2013. Jimmy adopted the name James Dixon Barnes, after his stepfather.

Cold Chisel

1973–1983
Barnes took up an apprenticeship in a foundry with the South Australian Railways in 1973, but the love he and his brother had for music led him to join a band. In 1974, his brother Swanee was playing drums with Fraternity, which had just parted ways with the singer Bon Scott. Barnes took over the role but his tenure with the band was brief and, in December 1975, he joined a harder-edged band called Orange, with the organist and songwriter Don Walker, guitarist Ian Moss, drummer Steve Prestwich and bass guitarist Les Kaczmarek.

In 1974, Orange had changed its name to Cold Chisel and began to develop a strong presence on the local music scene. Barnes' relationship with the band was often volatile and he left several times, leaving Moss to handle vocal duties until he returned. After a temporary move to Armidale, New South Wales while Walker completed his engineering studies there, Cold Chisel moved to Melbourne in August 1976, and then three months later shifted base to Sydney. Progress was slow and Barnes announced he was leaving once again in May 1977 to join Swanee in a band called Feather. However, his farewell performance with Cold Chisel went so well that he changed his mind and decided to stay in the band. A month later, WEA signed the band.

Between 1978 and 1984, Cold Chisel released five studio albums and won numerous TV Week / Countdown Awards. The band broke up in December 1983, its final performances at the Sydney Entertainment Centre running from 12 to 15 December 1983.

Solo career

1980s
In November 1979, Barnes met Jane Mahoney (born 1958 as Jane Dejakasaya in Bangkok, Thailand), the stepdaughter of an Australian diplomat. Barnes began a relationship with her. They married in Sydney on 22 May 1981 and Jane gave birth to their first child, Mahalia, named after Mahalia Jackson, on 12 July 1982. They have four children (Mahalia, Eliza-Jane, Elly-May and Jackie).

Barnes launched his solo career less than a month after Cold Chisel's Last Stand tour came to an end in December 1983. He assembled a band that included Arnott, the former Fraternity bass guitar player Bruce Howe and guitarists Mal Eastick (ex-Stars) and Chris Stockley (ex-The Dingoes) and began touring and writing for a solo album. Signing to Mushroom Records, Barnes released his first single, "No Second Prize", in August 1984, which peaked at number 12 on the Australian charts. His first solo album, Bodyswerve, was released in September 1984 and debuted at Number One on the Australian charts. On 22 December 1984, days after Barnes had begun that year's Barnestorming tour, his second daughter, Eliza-Jane ("E.J.") was born.

Barnes' second album, For the Working Class Man, was released in December 1985 and included the tracks "I'd Die to Be with You Tonight" and "Working Class Man". For the Working Class Man debuted on the Australian national chart at No. 1 in December 1985 and it remained at No. 1 for seven weeks. Titled simply Jimmy Barnes in the US, the album was issued in February to tie in with the release of the Ron Howard film Gung Ho, which used "Working Class Man".

The Jimmy Barnes band that toured Australia in support of the album included Howe and Arnott, with the keyboard player Peter Kekell, the former Rose Tattoo guitarist Robin Riley and the American guitarist Dave Amato. With the release of the album in America, Barnes and a band of Canadian musicians hand-picked by his North American management team toured with ZZ Top. It was the first time since 1981 that he had toured without his family, as Jane was pregnant. Shortly after their son Jackie (named after Jackie Wilson) was born on 4 February 1986, she and the children joined him in the US for the rest of the tour.

In 1986, Barnes recorded two songs with INXS, a cover version of the Easybeats' "Good Times" and "Laying Down The Law", which he co-wrote with INXS members Andrew Farriss and Michael Hutchence. "Good Times" was used as the theme song for the Australian Made series of concerts that toured the country in the summer of 1986–87. Australian Made was the largest touring festival of Australian music talent that had ever been attempted to that point. Barnes and INXS headlined and the rest of the line-up was Mental as Anything, Divinyls, Models, The Saints, I'm Talking and The Triffids. The shows began in Hobart, Tasmania, on 26 December and concluded in Sydney on Australia Day, 26 January 1987. A concert film of this event was made by Richard Lowenstein and released later that year. "Good Times" peaked at No. 2 on the Australian chart.

In October 1987, Barnes released "Too Much Ain't Enough Love", which became his first solo number-one single. His third album, Freight Train Heart, was released in December 1987 and peaked at number one. Freight Train Heart had moderate success outside Australia and as recently as 2003 was named as one of the top 100 rock albums of all time by the British magazine Powerplay.

In November 1988, Barnes released his first solo live album, Barnestorming, which became his fourth solo number one album. A version of the Percy Sledge standard "When a Man Loves a Woman" released from the album peaked at number 3.

In the middle of 1989, Jane Barnes went into Westmead Children's Hospital in Sydney with pregnancy complications. Elly-May Barnes was born almost three months prematurely on 3 May. Her father stopped further writing and recording until she was released from a humidicrib several months later.

1990s
In 1990, Barnes recorded his fourth studio album, which featured songwriting contributions from the likes of Desmond Child, Diane Warren and Holly Knight. Two Fires, released in August 1990. debuted at number one on the Australian chart.  The album featured the top-twenty singles "Lay Down Your Guns", "Let's Make it Last All Night" and "When Your Love is Gone".

In November 1991, Barnes released his fifth studio album, Soul Deep, an album of soul covers. Barnes had long fostered a love for soul and for  black music, naming his children after influential black artists and including songs by Sam Cooke and Percy Sledge on previous albums. Soul Deep became Barnes' sixth Australian number-one album and included the track "When Something Is Wrong with My Baby" with John Farnham.

In March 1993, Barnes released Heat, which was influenced by the then-current grunge trend and by the music of the Red Hot Chili Peppers. Heat peaked at number two on the ARIA charts, becoming Barnes's first solo album not to peak at number one. The album contained the song "Stone Cold", written by former Cold Chisel bandmate Don Walker. It marked the first time Jimmy Barnes had worked with any member of his old band for almost a decade. The pair teamed up for an acoustic version of the track for an unplugged album Flesh and Wood, which was released in December 1993 and peaked at number two. The album included a version, recorded with The Badloves, of The Band's "The Weight", which became a top-ten hit. Also in 1993, Barnes teamed up with Tina Turner for a duet version of  "The Best" in the form of a TV promotion for rugby league's Winfield Cup. The single also reached the top ten in 1993.

In the mid-1990s, Barnes' career suffered a slump. He faced financial ruin as his music-publishing company Dirty Sheet Music and his wife's children's fashion label both went broke. He was pursued both by the ANZ Bank and by the Australian Taxation Office for amounts exceeding $1.3 million. The family sold their property in Bowral, New South Wales, and settled for some time in Aix-en-Provence, France, attracting some adverse publicity when Barnes assaulted a television crew from  Channel 7. While there, Barnes did considerable live work throughout Britain and toured with the Rolling Stones.

In June 1995, Barnes released his eighth studio album, Psyclone, which peaked at number 2 in Australia and featured the top-twenty single  "Change of Heart".

In September 1996, Barnes released "Lover Lover", which peaked at number 6 on the singles chart. This was followed in October 1996 with Barnes' first greatest-hits compilation, Barnes Hits Anthology, which became Barnes' seventh solo number-one album.

In 1998, Cold Chisel reformed and Barnes returned to Australia with his family after three years in France. In March 1999 Barnes performed the 1978  Sylvester hit "You Make Me Feel (Mighty Real)" live onstage at the Sydney Gay and Lesbian Mardi Gras annual party.

Later that year Barnes released the heavy-rock single "Love and Hate", followed by its parent album  Love and Fear. An autobiographical record combining hard rock with electronic music, Love and Fear was Barnes' first album to miss the Australian top ten, peaking at number 22.

2000s

In October 2000, Barnes performed at the closing ceremony of the Sydney Olympics. In November 2000, Barnes released a second album of soul tunes, titled Soul Deeper... Songs From the Deep South. The album peaked at number 3 on the ARIA charts. A number of live albums followed with little commercial success.

In 2004, Barnes recorded an album with Deep Purple guitarist Steve Morse, Uriah Heep drummer Lee Kerslake, bass player Bob Daisley and keyboard player Don Airey under the name Living Loud. The self-titled album featured a number of songs originally written and recorded with Ozzy Osbourne by Kerslake, Daisley, and Airey.

In July 2005, Barnes released his eleventh studio album, Double Happiness, which debuted at number one on the ARIA Charts. Double Happiness was an album of duets, including several with his children, daughters Mahalia and Elly-May, son Jackie and oldest son, entertainer David Campbell. After its initial success, it was re-released as a double CD/DVD package featuring many of his duets from previous albums, including those with INXS, John Farnham, Joe Cocker, and Tina Turner.

Barnes was inducted into the ARIA Hall of Fame on 23 October 2005 for his solo career efforts. In late 2006, Barnes became patron of the Choir of Hard Knocks, a choral group formed by Jonathon Welch and consisting of homeless and disadvantaged people in Melbourne. The formation of the choir was documented by the ABC as a five-part series aired in May 2007. Barnes took an active part in the teaching of the choir despite his health problems and has even busked with them. Barnes or a member of his extended family have regularly performed "Flame Trees" with the Choir at their concerts including those at Melbourne Town Hall on 24 June and the Sydney Opera House on 17 July 2007.

In a January 2007 interview with The Bulletin, Barnes spoke passionately about Australian rock musicians saying: "Australian bands for me will always have the grunt. Grunt is what gives you longevity, strength, the power to believe in yourself. We have great bands here because they play live, they cut their teeth playing to people.".

Barnes underwent heart surgery in February 2007.Barnes under the knife On 7 July 2007 Barnes was a presenter at the Australian leg of Live Earth. In August he became a regular presenter on The Know, a pop culture program on the pay-TV channel MAX and has also been a presenter of the Planet Rock program on the Austereo network. 

In September 2007 he started recording his twelfth studio album, Out in the Blue. Produced by Nash Chambers, it was released on 14 November and debuted at number 3 on the ARIA chart. The songs were written while he recovered from his heart surgery, and displayed a more subdued mood than much of his previous output. "When Two Hearts Collide" was a duet with Kasey Chambers. The album was promoted with a performance at the Sydney Opera House, which was released on CD and DVD. In March 2008, Barnes appeared as a special guest during soul singer Guy Sebastian's tour.

November 2008 saw the release of a duet with son David Campbell, a cover of The Righteous Brothers' "You've Lost That Lovin' Feeling" that featured on Campbell's album Good Lovin'.

In September 2009, Barnes released his thirteenth studio album The Rhythm and the Blues which became Barnes' ninth Australian number one album; thus giving him more No. 1 albums than any other Australian artist.

2010s
In August 2010, Barnes released his fourteenth solo studio album, Rage and Ruin. Barnes stated that the ideas for most of the lyrics and song themes came from a journal he kept during a period in his life (late 1990s to early 2000s) when he struggled with drug and alcohol addiction. Rage and Ruin debuted at number 3 on the ARIA Charts on 5 September 2010.

On 27 September 2010, it was revealed that Barnes met two previously unknown adult daughters.

On 14 March 2011 he planted a flame tree, made famous in Cold Chisel's 1984 song "Flame Trees", at the National Arboretum Canberra. Barnes then headlined at Celebrate in the Park, playing a 90-minute set which included his solo hits and some Cold Chisel greats. He was joined by daughter Mahalia in a soulful rendition of "When the War Is Over", which he dedicated to the memory of Steve Prestwich.

In August 2014, Barnes released, 30:30 Hindsight, which is an anniversary album, celebrating 30 years since his chart-topping debut solo album, Bodyswerve. The album debuted at No. 1 in Australia, becoming Barnes' 10th solo No. 1 album.

In 2015, Barnes asked the Reclaim Australia Political Party to stop playing his music at their Rallies. In July 2015, it was announced that Barnes would release Best of the Soul Years compilation. The album would be compiled of soul and R&B classics, from his three soul albums; "Soul Deep" (1991), "Soul Deeper" (2000) and "The Rhythm and the Blues" (2009). A fourth album of soul covers was released in June 2016 called, Soul Searchin', which became Barnes' 11th number one album in Australia and tied Barnes the equal second-most (with Madonna and U2) of all time behind The Beatles at 14.

In 2016, Barnes released his autobiography, Working Class Boy, which explored his traumatic childhood experiences. In 2017, he featured in the song "Big Enough" by Kirin J. Callinan, alongside Alex Cameron and Molly Lewis. The song was featured on The Tonight Show with Jimmy Fallon in a comedic skit. In addition to this, his cameo in the song's music video became a popular internet meme in late 2017. In March of the same year, Barnes released a children's album called Och Aye the G'nu. It won the ARIA Award for Best Children's Album at the ARIA Music Awards of 2017, although the brand that appeared on the album, as well as the poetry books that were released on the first of April are related to The Wiggles.

In November 2017, Barnes released a second memoir; a sequel to Working Class Boy titled Working Class Man. On 3 May 2018, Barnes won the biography of the year award at the Australian Book Industry Awards for the second year in a row.

Barnes also guest-starred in the television comedy "These New South Whales" based on the Australian band.

His autobiography Working Class Boy was adapted into a film by Universal Pictures. Directed by Mark Joffe, the film premiered in Australian cinemas on 23 August 2018. A soundtrack was released on 17 August 2018.

In January 2019, Barnes announced his forthcoming eighteenth solo studio album My Criminal Record. It was released on 17 May 2019. It was Barnes's 12th solo number-one album, and 16th including releases with Cold Chisel on the Australian albums chart, making him the artist with the most chart-topping albums in Australian chart history, having previously tied at 11 number ones with Madonna and U2. At the APRA Music Awards of 2020, "Shutting Down Our Town" was nominated for Most Performed Rock Work of the Year.

2020s
In 2021, Barnes stated that he formed a rockabilly band with Slim Jim Phantom and Chris Cheney.

In April 2022, Barnes announced the forthcoming release of Soul Deep 30, celebrating the 30th anniversary of Soul Deep, alongside a national tour. In November 2022, Barnes released his first Christmas album, Blue Christmas. It became his fifteenth number-one solo album.

In March 2023, Barnes announced the formation of supergroup The Barnestormers, featuring Barnes, Chris Cheney, Slim Jim Phantom, Jools Holland and Kevin Shirley. A self-titled album is set for release on 26 May 2023.

Personal life
Barnes is a practising Buddhist. He has seven children, four with his wife Jane: Mahalia, Elly-May, Eliza-Jane and Jackie, one with Kim Campbell (a previous relationship): David Campbell, and two daughters from earlier relationships: Amanda Bennett and Megan Torzyn.

He is brother-in-law to fellow musician and long time collaborator, Diesel, who married Jane Barnes's sister, Jep, in 1989.

Barnes is a supporter of the Australian Labor Party, as well as the Port Adelaide Football Club.

Discography

Cold Chisel

Studio albums
 Bodyswerve (1984)
 For the Working Class Man (1985)
 Freight Train Heart (1987)
 Two Fires (1990)
 Soul Deep (1991)
 Heat (1993)
 Flesh and Wood (1993)
 Psyclone (1995)
 Love and Fear (1999)
 Soul Deeper... Songs From the Deep South (2000)
 Double Happiness (2005)
 Out in the Blue (2007)
 The Rhythm and the Blues (2009)
 Rage and Ruin (2010)
 30:30 Hindsight (2014)
 Soul Searchin' (2016)
 Och Aye the G'nu (2017)
 Working Class Boy (2018)
 My Criminal Record (2019)
 Flesh and Blood (2021)
 Blue Christmas (2022)

Honours and significant awards
In 2017 Barnes was appointed an Officer of the Order of Australia for distinguished service to the performing arts as a musician, singer and songwriter, and through support for not-for-profit organisations, particularly to children with a disability.

AIR Awards
The Australian Independent Record Awards (commonly known informally as AIR Awards) is an annual awards night to recognise, promote and celebrate the success of Australia's Independent Music sector.

! 
|-
| 2022
| Flesh and Blood
| Best Independent Rock Album or EP
| 
|

APRA Awards
The APRA Awards are held in Australia and New Zealand by the Australasian Performing Right Association to recognise songwriting skills, sales and airplay performance by its members annually.

|-
| 2016
| (Jimmy Barnes as part of) Cold Chisel
| Ted Albert Award for Outstanding Services to Australian Music
| 
|-
| 2020
| "Shutting Down Our Town" (featuring Troy Cassar-Daley)
| Most Performed Rock Work
| 
|-
| 2022
| "Flesh and Blood"
| Most Performed Rock Work
| 
|-

ARIA Awards
Barnes has won seven Australian Recording Industry Association (ARIA) Awards, including his induction into their Hall of Fame in 2005.
{| class="wikitable"
!Year
!Award
!Nominee/work
!Result
|-
| rowspan="4" |1987
|Best Male Artist
| rowspan="3" |"Good Times" (with INXS)
|
|-
|Single of the Year
|
|-
|Highest Selling Single
|
|-
| Producer of the Year
| Mark Opitz for INXS & Jimmy Barnes – "Good Times"
| 
|-
|1989
|Best Male Artist
|Barnestorming
|
|-
|1991
|Best Male Artist
|Two Fires
|
|-
| rowspan="6" |1992
|Album of the Year
| rowspan="4" |Soul Deep
|
|-
|Best Male Artist
|
|-
|Highest Selling Album
|
|-
|Best Cover Art
|
|-
|Single of the Year
| rowspan="2" |"When Something Is Wrong with My Baby" (with John Farnham)
|
|-
|Highest Selling Single
|
|-
|1993
|Best Male Artist
|"Ain't No Mountain High Enough"
|
|-
| rowspan="3" |1994
|Best Male Artist
| rowspan="2"|Flesh and Wood
|
|-
|Highest Selling Album
|
|-
|Single of the Year
|"Stone Cold"
|
|-
| rowspan="2" |1997
|Highest Selling Album
|Hits
|
|-
|Best Male Artist
|"Lover Lover"
|
|-
|2005
| Hall of Fame
| Jimmy Barnes
| 
|-
|2008
|Best Adult Contemporary Album
|Out in the Blue
|
|-
|2009
|Best Music DVD
|Live at the Enmore
|
|-
|2010
|Best Adult Contemporary Album
|The Rhythm and the Blues
|
|-
|2014
|Best Rock Album
|30:30 Hindsight
|
|-
|2016
|Best Blues and Roots Album
|Soul Searchin'''
|
|-
|2017
|Best Children's Album
|Och Aye The G'Nu!|
|-
|2018
|Best Original Soundtrack or Musical Theatre Cast Album
|Working Class Boy: The Soundtracks|
|-
|2019
|Best Rock Album
|My Criminal Record|
|}

Country Music Awards of Australia
The Country Music Awards of Australia (CMAA) (also known as the Golden Guitar Awards) is an annual awards night held in January during the Tamworth Country Music Festival, celebrating recording excellence in the Australian country music industry. They have been held annually since 1973.

|-
| 2006
| "Birds on a Wire" (with Troy Cassar-Daley)
| Vocal Collaboration of the Year
| 

Helpmann Awards
The Helpmann Awards is an awards show, celebrating live entertainment and performing arts in Australia, presented by industry group Live Performance Australia since 2001. Note: 2020 and 2021 were cancelled due to the COVID-19 pandemic.
 

! 
|-
| 2015
| 30:30 Hindsight Greatest Hits Tour 2014 | Helpmann Award for Best Australian Contemporary Concert
| 
|
|-
| 2017
| Working Class Boy: An Evening of Stories & Songs | Helpmann Award for Best Cabaret Performer
| 
|
|-

Rolling Stone Australia Awards
The Rolling Stone Australia Awards are awarded annually in January or February by the Australian edition of Rolling Stone magazine for outstanding contributions to popular culture in the previous year.

! 
|-
| 2022
| Jimmy Barnes
| Rolling Stone Readers' Choice Award
| 
|
|-

TV Week / Countdown AwardsCountdown was an Australian pop music TV series on national broadcaster ABC-TV from 1974 to 1987, it presented music awards from 1979 to 1987, initially in conjunction with magazine TV Week. The TV Week / Countdown Awards were a combination of popular-voted and peer-voted awards.

|-
| 1980
| himself
| Most Popular Male Performer
| 
|-
| rowspan="2" | 1984
| rowspan="2" | himself
| Best Male Performance in a Video
| 
|-
| Best Songwriter
| 
|-
| 1985
| himself – "Working Class Man"
| Best Male Performance in a Video
| 
|-
| rowspan="2" | 1986
| himself & INXS "Good Times"
| Best Group Performance in a Video
| 
|-
| himself – "Ride the Night Away"
| Best Male Performance in a Video
| 
|-

References

 Further reading 
 Who's Who of Australian Rock – Chris Spencer, Paul McHenry, Zbig Nowara, 2002; Say it Loud with Alan Whiticker, Published by Gary Allen, Australia, September 2002; Icons of Australian Music: Jimmy Barnes'' – Scott Podmore. Published by Hyperactive Inc. 2008; 
Fraternity: Pub Rock Pioneers - Victor Marshall, Published by Brolga Publishing, Australia, 2021 ISBN 978-1920785109

External links

Jimmy Barne's Profile on Fraternity's Official Website
Unofficial Jimmy Barnes website dedicated to collecting everything JB related

1956 births
Living people
ARIA Award winners
ARIA Hall of Fame inductees
Australian Buddhists
Australian male singer-songwriters
Australian people of Scottish-Jewish descent
Australian rock singers
Scottish rock singers
Cold Chisel members
Converts to Buddhism
Musicians from Adelaide
Musicians from Sydney
Musicians from Glasgow
Naturalised citizens of Australia
Officers of the Order of Australia
Scottish emigrants to Australia
Scottish people of Jewish descent
Australian autobiographers
Scottish autobiographers
Australian expatriates in France
Australian soul singers
Australian rhythm and blues musicians
Australian soul musicians
Australian rhythm and blues singers
Australian male writers
Swan musical family
Living Loud members
Geffen Records artists
Mushroom Records artists
Internet memes
Provogue Records artists
Australian harmonica players